Shannon Cox (born 7 March 1986) is a former Australian rules footballer for the Collingwood Football Club in the Australian Football League (AFL).

Cox, an Indigenous footballer, was picked up as a rookie by Collingwood at the 2005 National Rookie Draft and, following some good performances for Williamstown in the Victorian Football League (VFL), was promoted to the senior list for the 2007 season. He made his AFL debut in round 3 of that season. In 2009, he played 11 of the first 13 games, including a career high 28 possession game against the Brisbane Lions in round 4. 

On 12 November 2009 he announced his retirement, citing a loss of passion for the game. Cox now is playing in the SWFL (South West Football League) in WA, for the Collie Eagles.

References

External links

1986 births
Living people
Collingwood Football Club players
Indigenous Australian players of Australian rules football
Williamstown Football Club players
Australian rules footballers from Western Australia